De Immigrant is a windmill located in Fulton, Illinois, built on a flood control dike on the Mississippi River. The City of Fulton contracted Molema Millbuilders, Havenga Construction, and Lowlands Management on December 4, 1998, to construct a Dutch windmill, to be fabricated by native millwrights in the Netherlands and shipped to Fulton for assembly. Two months later, construction began with thirty metric tons of wood. The construction took place in phases, and the tower, cap, sails, and machinery were all put together on November 19, 1999. On May 5, 2001, De Immigrant officially began grinding wheat, buckwheat, rye, and cornmeal.

References

External links
 City of Fulton: De Immigrant Windmill
Building De Immigrant, a photo diary

Buildings and structures in Whiteside County, Illinois
Smock mills in the United States
Tourist attractions in Whiteside County, Illinois
Grinding mills in Illinois
Dutch-American culture in Illinois
Windmills completed in 1999
Windmills in Illinois
1999 establishments in Illinois